Sudheesh Pappu (1977/1978 – 14 November 2022), professionally credited mononymously as Pappu, was an Indian cinematographer who worked in Malayalam cinema.

Early life
Pappu was born in Thrippunithura, Ernakulam, Kerala. He was schooled in Kendriya Vidyalaya, Ernakulam.

Career
Pappu began his career by assisting cinematographer Rajeev Ravi in films such as Chandni Bar (2001), Sesham (2002) and Dev.D (2009), and subsequently made his debut as an independent cinematographer with the Malayalam crime film Second Show in 2012. From then, Pappu worked in a number of Malayalam films, including the mystery thriller Koothara (2014), Ayaal Sassi, Rose Guitarinaal, Njan Steve Lopez (2014) and the romantic drama Eeda (2018).

Death
Pappu died at Ernakulam on 14 November 2022, at the age of 44. He was suffering from Amyloidosis and was on treatment for some time. He was hospitalised during the filming of Appan.

Filmography

References

External links
 

1970s births
Year of birth missing
2022 deaths
Cinematographers from Kerala
Malayalam film cinematographers
People from Ernakulam district
Deaths from amyloidosis